= History of telegraph =

History of telegraph may refer to:

- History of telegraphy in general
- History of the electrical telegraph or history of wireless telegraphy in particular
